Élie Monnier (24 June 1908 – 12 May 1941) was a French sports shooter. He competed in the 25 m pistol event at the 1936 Summer Olympics.

References

1908 births
1941 deaths
French male sport shooters
Olympic shooters of France
Shooters at the 1936 Summer Olympics
Place of birth missing
20th-century French people